Liceo Municipal Zoila Rosa Carreño is a Chilean high school located in Malloa, Cachapoal Province, Chile. It was established in 2003.

References

External links
 

Secondary schools in Chile
Schools in Cachapoal Province
2003 establishments in Chile
Educational institutions established in 2003